The Stazione Sperimentale per la Seta (SSS) (Silk Experimental Station) is a special Agency of the Chamber of Commerce in Milan.
It is an Institute for applied research, established in Milan in 1923, and operating on a national scale with the specific aim of promoting the technical and technological progress in the  silk and derived products industry. In 1999 SSS was transformed into a public economic institution with important legal, operational and administrative modifications which, however, have left its mission and functions unchanged.

See also
Stazione Sperimentale per i Combustibili
Stazione Sperimentale per le Industrie degli Oli e dei Grassi
Stazione Sperimentale Carta, Cartoni e Paste per Carta
Stazione Sperimentale per l'Industria delle Pelli e delle Materie Concianti

References

External links
Homepage of the SSS

Experimental Stations for Industry in Italy
Economy of Milan